Clarke's Gap, also known as Clarks Gap, is a pass through Catoctin Mountain west of Leesburg, Virginia. The gap is not a true wind gap, but rather a man-made railroad cut through a local saddle point between two ridges to the southeast and northwest created by the drainage of Dry Mill Branch of Tuscarora Creek to the east and an unnamed tributary of Catoctin Creek to the west.

The original road between Alexandria and Winchester, known as Vestal's Gap or Braddock's Road passed through the gap beginning in the middle 18th century.  Later, in the 1860s the Alexandria, Loudoun and Hampshire Railroad, predecessor of the Washington and Old Dominion Railroad was routed through the gap.  The railroad christened the gap when it established a station there, naming it after a nearby landowner, Addison H. Clarke.  Today, Dry Mill Road (Virginia State Route 699 (VA Route 699)) and the Washington and Old Dominion Trail still pass through the gap.  VA Route 7 and VA Route 9 pass just to the north of the gap, through a man-made highway cut, which the Virginia Department of Transportation has mistakenly signed as "Clarks Gap".

References

Scheel, Eugene. Loudoun Discovered:Communities, Corners and Crossroads. Vol. 4. 2002, pp. 1–3.

Landforms of Loudoun County, Virginia
Wind gaps of Virginia